Dutch Sign Language ( or NGT; Sign Language of the Netherlands or SLN) is the predominant sign language used by deaf people in the Netherlands.

Although the same spoken Dutch language is used in the Netherlands and Flanders, the Dutch Sign Language (NGT) is not the same as Flemish Sign Language (VGT). They do have the late 18th-century Old French Sign Language as their common ancestor, but have diverged during the subsequent 200 years, so that mutual intelligibility between modern users has been greatly reduced.

History

Origins 

The origins of Dutch Sign Language (NGT) are traceable to Old French Sign Language (VLSF), a term for the sign language that the community of about 200 deaf Parisians used amongst themselves in the mid-18th century. The abbot Charles-Michel de l'Épée wanted to give them religious education, and thus learnt their language, after which he made some adjustments of it himself. Around 1760, he opened a school for the deaf in Paris, the predecessor of the current Institut National de Jeunes Sourds de Paris. Educators from all over Europe came to this and later French schools for the deaf in order to adopt l'Épée's teaching method, and introduce it in their own countries. Therefore, this Old French Sign Language as modified by l'Épée spread across Europe, North America and other continents and became the basis of most modern sign languages, including Dutch Sign Language. The Walloon preacher , born in Blegny, studied in Franeker, and preached in the Walloon church of Groningen since 1777.

Dialect formation in early schools for the deaf 

Before the standardisation of the sign language several regional variants were used in the Netherlands and the use of signs was discouraged in order to stimulate deaf people to acquire self-reliance. In the 1900–1980 period, the use of signs was prohibited in education as a consequence of the Milan Conference of 1880. Instead, the oralist method (also called the 'German method') was practiced: deaf people were instructed to learn to speak by imitating hearing people by lip reading, feeling how they used their larynx to make sounds that they were then tasked to imitate. Nevertheless, deaf people continued to use signs amongst themselves, leading to the rise of five dialects within and around the five schools for the deaf Groningen, Rotterdam, Amsterdam, Voorburg and Sint-Michielsgestel.

Standardisation 
As of 1995, more and more schools for the deaf in The Netherlands teach Signed Dutch (Nederlands met Gebaren). This uses the grammar of Dutch rather than NGT.

Recognition 
In September 2019, D66, PvdA and CU proposed a bill of law initiative for official recognition of NGT. Since 13 October 2020 has been officially recognised.

Education 
There are currently five schools for deaf children in the country, with the first being built at the end of the 18th century and the rest between the end of the 19th century and the beginning of the 20th century. While the first school used a manual method to teach the language, signing was originally prohibited in each of the latter schools and they instead tended to use an oral method of teaching. Today, because of cochlear implants, education is consistently leaning towards oralist methods.

See also
Fingerspelling
Legal recognition of sign languages
List of sign languages
Sign Language Studies (journal)

References 

"Did You Know Dutch Sign Language Is Vulnerable?" Endangered Languages. N.p., n.d. Web.
Kimmelman, V. (2014). Information structure in Russian Sign Language and Sign Language of the Netherlands (Unpublished master's thesis, 2014). Amsterdam Center for Language and Communication (ACLC).

Further reading 
Bank, R., Crasborn, O., & van Hout, R. (2011). Variation in mouth actions with manual signs in Sign Language of the Netherlands (NGT). Sign Language & Linguistics, 14(2), 248–270.
Crasborn, O., van der Kooij, E., Ros, J., & de Hoop, H. (2009). Topic agreement in NGT (Sign Language of the Netherlands). Linguistic Review, 26(2/3), 355–370. 
Crasborn, O., van der Kooij, E., Waters, D., Woll, B., & Mesch, J. (2008). Frequency distribution and spreading behavior of different types of mouth actions in three sign languages. Sign Language & Linguistics, 11(1), 45–67.
De Clerck, L., & van der Kooij, E. (2005). Modifiable and intensifier self in Dutch and Sign Language of the Netherlands. Linguistics In The Netherlands, 2261–72.
Sandler, W., & Lillo-Martin, D. (2006). Sign language and linguistic universals. Cambridge: Cambridge Univ. Press.
Schermer, T. (2012). Sign Language Planning in the Netherlands between 1980 and 2010. Sign Language Studies, 12(4), 467–493.
Zwets, M. (2014). Locating the difference: A comparison between Dutch pointing gestures and pointing signs in Sign Language of the Netherlands (Unpublished doctoral dissertation). Proefschrift Radboud Universiteit Nijmegen ter verkrijging van de graad van doctor in het jaar.

External links
Online Video Dictionary in Dutch - choose the "Gebaren" menu and then click on "Gebarenwoordenboek".
Online Lexicon with several methods to practice NGT in Dutch - NGT Lexicon free to search and usable with Google Translate.
Dutch Sign Language
Word play in sign language

Languages of the Netherlands
Sign languages